Budziszów may refer to the following places in Poland:
Budziszów in Gmina Kostomłoty, Środa Śląska County in Lower Silesian Voivodeship (SW Poland)
Budziszów in Gmina Kobierzyce, Wrocław County in Lower Silesian Voivodeship (SW Poland)